is a 1964 Japanese film directed by Kenji Misumi. From a screenplay by Kazuro Funabashi, based upon the short story Ken (Sword) by  Yukio Mishima.

Synopsis
The story is centered on Kokubu Jiro (Raizo Ichikawa), a prominent member of his university's Kendo dojo.

Starring
Raizo Ichikawa - Jiro Kokubun
Akio Hasegawa - Mibu
Chikako Miyagi - Kiuchi
Yuka Konno - Sheko Fujishiro
Junko Kozakura - Sanae Mibu
Yoshio Inaba - Seiichiro Kokubun
Rieko Sumi - Horoko Kokubun
Yūsuke Kawazu - Kagawa

References

External links
 
 A review of the film at Midnight Eye

1964 films
Japanese black-and-white films
1960s Japanese-language films
Films based on short fiction
Films based on works by Yukio Mishima
Japanese martial arts films
Daiei Film films
Films directed by Kenji Misumi
1960s Japanese films